Psychout Records is an independent record label founded by Nicke Andersson primarily to release material with his band The Hellacopters.

History
The idea to start his own label came after experiencing problems with record labels during his time as the drummer of the heavy metal band Entombed which  made four years pass between Wolverine Blues from 1993 and its follow up DCLXVI: To Ride Shoot Straight and Speak the Truth from 1997. While the label mostly has been used for Hellacopters releases other artist such as The Robots who released a tribute single to the Swedish Formula One driver Ronnie Peterson, as well as the Neil Leyton, Dregen and Nicke Anderssons collaboration The Point.

Discography

References

External links
Official Hellacopters website

Swedish independent record labels
Rock record labels
Record labels established in 1995